Helin Bölek (5 June 1991 – 3 April 2020) was a Kurdish member of the leftist Turkish folk music band Grup Yorum.

Life
Bölek, the daughter of a family from Diyarbakır, worked in art during her youth. She took part in Grup Yorum as a soloist. She was arrested for the first time during a police operation at the İdil Culture Center in Istanbul in November 2016, when she was detained with seven other members of the group on charges of "resisting the police, insulting and being a member of a terrorist organization". The musicians Bahar Kurt, Barış Yüksel and Ali Aracı announced that they started an "indefinite and irreversible" hunger strike on 17 May 2019, to end the pressures from the state, the concert bans, and the raids on cultural centers.

Bölek joined the hunger strike in June 2019. She was released in November 2019 but kept on fasting. On 11 March 2020, İbrahim Gökçek and Helin Bölek were taken out to the Umraniye State Hospital after a police raid that morning at their home in Küçükarmutlu, Istanbul. In a statement made by their lawyer Didem Ünsal, the two Grup Yorum members stated that they were taken to the hospital by ambulance and that they were admitted to the emergency room, where they declared that they did not accept intervention or treatment.

Death
She died on 3 April 2020, the 288th day of a hunger strike at her home in Istanbul, which was held as a means to protest against the treatment of the band by the Turkish Government led by Recep Tayyip Erdoğan. After her death, large crowds mourned Helin Bölek, and they began to march towards a Cemevi. The police intervened the march and detained several participants, but the crowds managed to deliver her coffin to a Cemevi. The crowds intended to go to the cemetery, but the police impeded it and detained several participants of the ceremony again. Afterwards, the police transported Helin Bölek to the cemetery.

References

1992 births
2020 deaths
People who died on hunger strike
Kurdish women singers
Turkish Kurdish people
Turkish Kurdish women
Place of birth missing
21st-century Turkish women singers
Burials at Feriköy Cemetery